May the Music Never End is a 2003 studio album by Shirley Horn, it was Horn's last studio album.

Reception

The Allmusic review by Tim Sendra commented: "Horn's trademark sound is the sparse, languid torch song, with atmospheric piano chords and her gentle and soulful vocals caressing the notes as she slowly lets them ease into the listener's ear. ..If it is indeed her swan song, then she went out the same way she came in: as a true classic". At the time of the album's recording, Horn had stopped playing piano for health-related reasons, and pianists George Mesterhazy and Ahmad Jamal were chosen to provide her accompaniment.

Track listing
 "Forget Me" (Valerie Parks Brown) – 3:30
 "If You Go Away" (Jacques Brel, Rod McKuen) – 4:49
 "Yesterday" (John Lennon, Paul McCartney) – 4:14
 "Take Love Easy" (Duke Ellington, John Latouche) – 5:12
 "Never Let Me Go" (Ray Evans, Jay Livingston) – 5:17
 "Watch What Happens" (Norman Gimbel, Michel Legrand) – 3:29
 "Ill Wind" (Harold Arlen, Ted Koehler) – 7:09
 "Maybe September" (Evans, Percy Faith, Livingston) – 7:10
 "Everything Must Change" (Bernard Ighner) – 5:01
 "This Is All I Ask" (Gordon Jenkins) – 6:43
 "May the Music Never End" (Artie Butler, Norman Martin) – 5:07

Personnel
Shirley Horn -  vocals
Roy Hargrove - trumpet
Ed Howard - double bass
Ahmad Jamal - piano
George Mesterhazy - piano, arranging partner
Steve Williams – drums

References

2003 albums
Shirley Horn albums
Verve Records albums